Sidra Nawaz Bhatti (born 14 March 1994) is a Pakistani cricketer who currently plays as a wicket-keeper and right-handed batter for Pakistan. She made her international debut against Australia on 21 August 2014 in a Twenty20 International. She has also played domestic cricket for Lahore, Federal Capital, Punjab, Higher Education Commission, Omar Associates, Saif Sports Saga, State Bank of Pakistan and Zarai Taraqiati Bank Limited.

In October 2018, she was named in Pakistan's squad for the 2018 ICC Women's World Twenty20 tournament in the West Indies. In January 2020, she was named in Pakistan's squad for the 2020 ICC Women's T20 World Cup in Australia.

In June 2021, Nawaz was named as the captain of Pakistan women's A Team for their 20-over matches against the West Indies. In October 2021, she was named in Pakistan's team for the 2021 Women's Cricket World Cup Qualifier tournament in Zimbabwe. In January 2022, she was named in Pakistan's team for the 2022 Women's Cricket World Cup in New Zealand.

References

External links
 
 

Living people
1994 births
Cricketers from Lahore
Pakistani women cricketers
Pakistan women One Day International cricketers
Pakistan women Twenty20 International cricketers
Lahore women cricketers
Federal Capital women cricketers
Punjab (Pakistan) women cricketers
Higher Education Commission women cricketers
Omar Associates women cricketers
Saif Sports Saga women cricketers
State Bank of Pakistan women cricketers
Zarai Taraqiati Bank Limited women cricketers
Asian Games medalists in cricket
Cricketers at the 2014 Asian Games
Asian Games gold medalists for Pakistan
Medalists at the 2014 Asian Games
People from Lahore